Former students of the following education establishments are referred to as Old Johnians

 Hurstpierpoint College
 St John's School, Leatherhead